Hangman is a video game based on the pen-and-paper game of the same name released in 1978 by Atari, Inc. for the Atari VCS (renamed to the Atari 2600 in 1982).

Development
The game was programmed by Alan Miller, who later cofounded Activision, with cover art by Susan Jaekel. The game was coded in assembly code.

Game play

As in the traditional game of Hangman, the player must guess the letter of a hidden word, with each wrong guess resulting in a piece being added to a gallows, with the game ending either when the gallows is completed or when the word has been fully guessed. The player can select from a range of four difficulty levels from first grade to high school. The words have a maximum length of six characters. Instead of the traditional man to be hanged being shown in the picture, a monkey is shown hanging from the gallows by its arm. Hangman contains 510 words divided into four difficulty levels. A timed mode where the player has to guess before a time limit expires is also available.

The game may be played in single-player mode, or in a two-player mode where the players play together. In one-player mode the player has 11 attempts at guessing before the gallows is constructed. In two-player mode, guessing may go on until one player wins.

Reception
Contemporary reviewers were unimpressed with the game. UK-based TV Gamer described it as "poor value for money" as it differed little from the pen-and-paper version of the game. A review in the 1983 Book of Atari Software described it as a "nice implementation of the classic game" but also criticised the graphics, and gave the game a rating of "B" overall.

In a retrospective review in Classic Home Video Games, 1972-1984: A Complete Reference Guide, Brett Weiss described it as "a passable rendition of a classic game.

See also 

List of Atari 2600 games

References

External list
Hangman at Atari Mania

1978 video games
Atari 2600 games
Atari 2600-only games
Word puzzle video games
Video games about primates
Video games developed in the United States